Gandini Lianos  was a horse ridden by Rodrigo Pessoa. He won the World Championship in the sport of show jumping. He stands .

Major achievements 

1998 Rome: WEG World champion of show jumping
2000 Calgary: Spruce Meadows Grand Prix
2001 Calgary: Spruce Meadows Grand Prix

References
Rodrigo Pessoa web site

External links
Photo of Gandini Lianos
 Gandini Lianos pedigree

Show jumping horses
1987 animal births
Individual male horses